Rihards Kozlovskis (born 26 May 1969) is a Latvian politician and lawyer, a former Minister of the Interior of Latvia. He is a member of Unity. Between 2011 and 2014 he was a member of the Reform Party

Kozlovskis was appointed Interior Minister on 25 October 2011.

On 7 December 2015, prime minister Laimdota Straujuma resigned. In her resignation press release, she recommended Kozlovskis as her successor.

He has received the Order of Viesturs for his work during the 2006 Riga Summit.

References

External links
 Cabinet profile

1969 births
Living people
Politicians from Riga
Lawyers from Riga
Reform Party (Latvia) politicians
New Unity politicians
Ministers of the Interior of Latvia
Deputies of the 12th Saeima
Deputies of the 13th Saeima
Deputies of the 14th Saeima
20th-century Latvian lawyers
University of Latvia alumni
Latvian Academy of Sport Education alumni